The 44th Assembly District of Wisconsin is one of 99 districts in the Wisconsin State Assembly.  Located in southern Wisconsin, the district comprises most of the city of Janesville, in central Rock County.  It contains the University of Wisconsin–Whitewater at Rock County campus and the Southern Wisconsin Regional Airport.  The district is represented by Democrat Sue Conley, since January 2021.

The 44th Assembly district is located within Wisconsin's 15th Senate district, along with the 43rd and 45th Assembly districts.

History
The district was created in the 1972 redistricting act (1971 Wisc. Act 304) which first established the numbered district system, replacing the previous system which allocated districts to specific counties.  The 44th district was drawn with novel boundaries, taking the western half of Walworth County—which had been a single-district county in the previous scheme—and part of eastern Rock County, from what had been parts of the 1st and 3rd Rock County districts.  The only incumbent representative of the three divided districts who lived in the newly drawn 44th district was Republican Clarence J. Wilger, of the Walworth District.  Wilger sought election in the new district, but was defeated in the 1972 Republican primary.

Following the 1982 court-ordered redistricting, which scrambled all State Assembly districts, the 1983 redistricting (1983 Wisc. Act 29) moved the 44th district to its present location, based in the city of Janesville and neighboring towns.  The district's boundaries have shrunk further into the city as the population has grown relative to surrounding areas, the 2002 redistricting was the first to put the boundaries of the district entirely within the city of Janesville.

List of past representatives

References 

Wisconsin State Assembly districts
Rock County, Wisconsin